Golabkhvaran (also Romanized as Golābkhvārān; also known as Golābkhvorān) is a village in Tulem Rural District, Tulem District, Sowme'eh Sara County, Gilan Province, Iran. At the 2006 census, its population was 112, in 29 families.

References 

Populated places in Sowme'eh Sara County